Van Zyl is an Afrikaans toponymic surname. It derives from the Dutch surname Van Zijl, meaning "from Zijl" where Zijl is an archaic term for a waterway. Equivalent 

Van Zyl

Anton van Zyl (born 1980), South African rugby player
Carina van Zyl (born 1975), South African field hockey player
Corniel van Zyl (born 1979), South African Italian rugby player
Corrie van Zyl (born 1961), South African cricketer
Eben van Zijl (1931–2009), Namibian politician
Frederik van Zyl Slabbert (born 1940), South African politician
Gerard van Zijl (1607–1665), Dutch portrait and genre painter
Gideon Brand van Zyl (1873–1956), South African politician
Ian van Zyl (born 1980), Namibian cricketer
Irvette van Zyl (born 1987), South African long-distance runner
Jaco van Zyl (born 1985), South African golfer
Japie van Zyl (1957–2020) Namibian electrical engineer
Kayle van Zyl (born 1991), South African rugby player
Lizzie van Zyl (1894–1901), a child inmate of Bloemfontein concentration camp, whose photo was used as propaganda to convince the British public that Boer children were neglected by their parents
L. J. van Zyl (born 1985), South African hurdler
Marina van Zyl, South African politician
Paul van Zyl, South African lawyer and human rights activists
Piet van Zyl (born 1979), Namibian rugby union player
Riaan van Zyl (born 1972), South African born American rugby player
Sindisiwe van Zyl (1976–2021), Zimbabwe-born South African physician, columnist, health activist and broadcaster
Stiaan van Zyl (born 1987),  South African cricketer
Van der Zijl/Zyl
Annejet van der Zijl (born 1962), Dutch writer
Nikki van der Zyl (1935–2021), German voice actress
Werner van der Zyl (1902-1984), rabbi in Berlin and London, father of Nikki van der Zyl
Van Zijll
Theodoor Johan Arnold van Zijll de Jong (1836-1917), Dutch East Indies Army generals
Verzijl
Jan Franse Verzijl (1599-1647), Dutch portrait painter

Afrikaans-language surnames
Surnames of Dutch origin